Peptococcus is a Gram-positive bacterium genus in the family Peptococcaceae.

Species in the genus are part of the human microbiome, especially in the bacteria that form the gut flora. They are part of the flora of the mouth, upper respiratory tract and large intestine.

Mezlocillin is an antibiotic that is effective against Peptococcus species.

Peptococcus niger is the only species left in the genus. All others have been moved to Peptostreptococcus.

See also 
 List of human flora
 List of MeSH codes (B03) (bacteria)
 List of bacterial vaginosis microbiota
 List of bacterial orders
 List of bacteria genera

References

External links 
 Peptococcus at lpsn.dsmz.de

Peptococcaceae
Bacterial vaginosis
Bacteria genera